Greatbatch, a surname, may refer to:

 Bruce Greatbatch (1917–1989), British colonial official
 Mark Greatbatch (born 1963), New Zealand cricketer
 Shaun Greatbatch (born 1969), English darts player
 William Greatbatch, British potter
 Wilson Greatbatch (1919–2011), American inventor